The Armenian Declaration of Independence is the declaration of independence of the Armenian provinces from the Russian Empire. Armenia was proclaimed independent in Tiflis (present-day Tbilisi) on 28 May 1918. The declaration of the independence was as follows:

See also
 Declaration of State Sovereignty of Armenia
 Declaration of Independence of Azerbaijan
 Georgian Declaration of Independence, 1918

References

Bibliography 

 
 
 
 

1918 in Armenia
1918 in international relations
Declarations of independence
History of Tbilisi
1918 in Russia
1918 establishments in Armenia
May 1918 events
1918 documents
Separatism in Russia